Claudia Cislek (born 1990), known as Lolita Jolie, is a German singer of Polish descent.  She sings in French with a German accent.

Lolita Jolie is best known for the song "Joli Garçon" ("Cute Boy") which she first sang as just Lolita. The song peaked in January 2011 at #20 in the French single charts; and charted #28 in the German Top 50 ODC, compiled by Media Control, in 2011

Later she changed her stage name to Lolita Jolie, to avoid confusions with Austrian singer Edith Zuser, who also called herself Lolita.

In 2014, Lolita Jolie recorded a song with BaceFook, titled "Mon Chéri".

Discography
  2010: Joli Garçon 
  2011: La Première Fois
  2012: The Non Non Non
  2013: Moi Lolita
  2013: I Wanna Dance With You
  2014: Mon Chéri ft. BaceFook
  2015: Bonjour Madame

References

1990 births
Musicians from Munich
Living people
German people of Polish descent
21st-century German women singers